A scissors mechanism uses linked, folding supports in a criss-cross 'X' pattern.

Workings
Extension is achieved by applying pressure to the outside of a set of supports located at one end of the mechanism, elongating the crossing pattern.
This can be achieved through hydraulic, pneumatic, mechanical or simply muscular means.

It may require no power to return to its original position, but simply a release of the original pressure. Also used in kinematics of mechanisms

Uses
This mechanism is used in devices such as lift tables and scissor lifts. Modern low-profile computer keyboards make an extensive use of it as well, installing each key on a scissor support to ensure their smooth vertical movement, allowing the use of a cheap and reliable rubber dome contact set, instead of expensive and complex array of mechanical switches.

See also
 Pantograph
 Telescopic cylinder
 Linear actuator

References

Mechanisms (engineering)